Henrik Ejegod Mortensen (born 12 February 1968) is a former professional footballer.

Mortensen was a striker who played for Aarhus Gymnastikforening, Anderlecht, and Norwich City. During his early career, he was voted Danish young player of the year and was capped by Denmark under-21s. After moving to Anderlecht he won a Belgian championship medal and played in both the European Cup and European cup-winners cup.

Dave Stringer signed him for Norwich for a fee of £350,000 shortly after the start of the 1989-90 season. The move generated considerable interest among Norwich supporters, and a large crowd saw him mark his debut for the club's reserves at Carrow Road by scoring a spectacular overhead kick. Mortensen scored on his first team debut in a Zenith Data Systems Cup match against Brighton but was unable to maintain his impressive start. An injury forced him to retire from the English game in 1991. He returned to Aarhus, where he won a Danish Cup winners medal in 1996.

Sources 
 Canary Citizens by Mark Davage, John Eastwood, Kevin Platt, published by Jarrold Publishing, (2001),

External links 
Danish national team profile 
Career information at ex-canaries.co.uk
Career stats

1968 births
Living people
People from Odder Municipality
Danish men's footballers
Denmark under-21 international footballers
Denmark youth international footballers
Danish expatriate men's footballers
Aarhus Gymnastikforening players
R.S.C. Anderlecht players
Norwich City F.C. players
Belgian Pro League players
English Football League players
Expatriate footballers in Belgium
Expatriate footballers in England
Association football forwards
Sportspeople from the Central Denmark Region